Endalkachew Kebede (born August 17, 1980 in Addis Ababa) is a retired amateur Ethiopian boxer. He claimed a silver medal in the light flyweight division at the 2003 All-Africa Games in Abuja, Nigeria, and also represented his nation Ethiopia at the 2004 Summer Olympics.

Kebede qualified for the men's light flyweight division (48 kg) at the 2004 Summer Olympics in Athens. Earlier in the process, he guaranteed a spot on the Ethiopian boxing team after picking up a silver medal from the All-Africa Games. Kebede opened his bout with a forceful 26–21 victory over Japan's Toshiyuki Igarashi, before he lost the second round to China's Zou Shiming, resulting in an effortless score 8–31.

References

External links
ESPN Olympic Profile

1980 births
Living people
Ethiopian male boxers
Light-flyweight boxers
Olympic boxers of Ethiopia
Boxers at the 2004 Summer Olympics
Sportspeople from Addis Ababa
African Games silver medalists for Ethiopia
African Games medalists in boxing
Competitors at the 2003 All-Africa Games